Mystery Liner is a 1934 American Pre-Code film directed by William Nigh, starring Noah Beery, Sr., and based on an Edgar Wallace story originally published in the Saturday Evening Post in 1924. The film was entered as a feature attraction at the 1934 International Exhibition of Cinematographic Art in Venice, Italy, the forerunner of the Venice Film Festival.

Plot
Captain Holling (Beery) is relieved of command of his ship after he suffers a nervous breakdown. His replacement, Captain Downey (Howard), takes over the liner just as it is about to be used for an experiment in remote control.

Professor Grimson (Lewis) has devised a system for controlling the ship from a land-based laboratory. However, as Grimson demonstrates the system, a rival group is listening in, hoping to use the device for its own purposes.

Cast
 
Noah Beery as Capt. John Holling
Astrid Allwyn as Lila Kane
Edwin Maxwell as Major Pope
Gustav von Seyffertitz as Inspector Von Kessling
Ralph Lewis as Prof. Grimson
Cornelius Keefe as First Officer Cliff Rogers
Zeffie Tilbury as Granny Plimpton
Boothe Howard as Capt. Downey
Howard C. Hickman as Dr. Howard
Gabby Hayes as Joe, the watchman
George Cleveland as Simms the Steward

Critical reception
Leonard Maltin called the film an "intriguing but slow-paced B-picture" ; while Allmovie called it "a rather nifty little science fiction-thriller/murder mystery from Poverty Row company Monogram ... Typical low-budget fare, Mystery Liner is nevertheless well photographed by Archie Stout and for the most part capably acted" ; and TV Guide noted "a fine example of a well-made thriller created on the programmer assembly line...Veteran director William Nigh does a typically professional job with the few resources at his disposal and cinematographer Archie Stout (who would eventually win an Oscar for his work on John Ford's The Quiet Man, 1952) contributes some exceptional camerawork."

See also
List of films in the public domain in the United States

References

External links

1934 films
American mystery films
1934 adventure films
American black-and-white films
Films based on short fiction
Films based on works by Edgar Wallace
Films directed by William Nigh
Monogram Pictures films
Seafaring films
Articles containing video clips
American adventure films
1930s mystery films
Films set on ships
1930s English-language films
1930s American films